Charles Thomson Rees Wilson,  (14 February 1869 – 15 November 1959) was a Scottish physicist and meteorologist who won the Nobel Prize in Physics for his invention of the cloud chamber.

Education and early life
Wilson was born in the parish of Glencorse, Midlothian to Annie Clark Harper and John Wilson, a sheep farmer. After his father died in 1873, he moved with his family to Manchester. With financial support from his step-brother he studied biology at Owens College, now the University of Manchester, with the intent of becoming a doctor. In 1887, he graduated from the College with a BSc. He won a scholarship to attend Sidney Sussex College, Cambridge, where he became interested in physics and chemistry. In 1892 he received 1st class honours in both parts of the Natural Science Tripos.

Career
He became particularly interested in meteorology, and in 1893 he began to study clouds and their properties. Beginning in 1894, he worked for some time at the observatory on Ben Nevis, where he made observations of cloud formation. He was particularly fascinated by the appearance of glories. He then tried to reproduce this effect on a smaller scale at the Cavendish Laboratory in Cambridge, expanding humid air within a sealed container. He later experimented with the creation of cloud trails in his chamber by condensation onto ions generated by radioactivity. Several of his cloud chambers survive.

Wilson was made Fellow of Sidney Sussex College, and University Lecturer and Demonstrator in 1900. He was known by some as a poor lecturer, due to a pronounced stutter.

Contributions 
The invention of the cloud chamber was by far Wilson's signature accomplishment, earning him the Nobel Prize for Physics in 1927. The Cavendish laboratory praised him for the creation of "a novel and striking method of investigating the properties of ionized gases". The cloud chamber allowed huge experimental leaps forward in the study of subatomic particles and the field of particle physics, generally. Some have credited Wilson with making the study of particles possible at all.

Wilson published numerous papers on meteorology and physics, on topics including X-rays, ionization, thundercloud formation, and other meteorological events. Wilson may also have observed a sprite in 1924, 65 years before their official discovery. Weather was a focus of his work throughout his career, from his early observations at Ben Nevis to his final paper, on thunderclouds.

Method 
Retrospectively, Wilson's experimental method has received some attention from scholars.

In a period of scientific inquiry characterized by a divide between "analytical" and "morphological" scientists, Wilson's method of inquiry represented a hybrid. While some scientists believed phenomena should be observed in pure nature, others proposed laboratory-controlled experiments as the premier method for inquiry. Wilson used a combination of methods in his experiments and investigations. Wilson's work "made things visible whose properties had only previously been deduced indirectly".

He has been called "almost the last of the great individual experimenters in physics". He used his cloud chamber in various ways to demonstrate the operating principles of things like subatomic particles and X-rays. But his primary interest, and the subject of the bulk of his papers, was meteorology.

Awards, honours and legacy
Wilson was elected a Fellow of the Royal Society (FRS) in 1900.

For the invention of the cloud chamber he received the Nobel Prize in Physics in 1927. He shared this prize with the American physicist Arthur Compton, rewarded for his work on the particle nature of radiation. Despite Wilson's great contribution to particle physics, he remained interested in atmospheric physics, specifically atmospheric electricity, for his entire career. For example, his last research paper, published in 1956 when he was in his late eighties (at that time he was the oldest FRS to publish a paper in the Royal Society's journals), was on atmospheric electricity.

The Wilson crater on the Moon is named after him, Alexander Wilson and Ralph Elmer Wilson. The Wilson Condensation Cloud formations that occur after large explosions, such as nuclear detonations, are named after him. The Wilson Society, the scientific society of Sidney Sussex College, Cambridge is named in his honour, as is the CTR Wilson Institute for Atmospheric Electricity, the Atmospheric Electricity Special Interest Group of the Royal Meteorological Society.

The archives of C.T.R Wilson are maintained by the Archives of the University of Glasgow.

In 2012, the Royal Society of Edinburgh held a meeting in honour of Wilson, the "Great Scottish Physicist".

Personal life
In 1908, Wilson married Jessie Fraser, the daughter of a minister from Glasgow. The couple had four children. His family knew him as patient and curious, and fond of taking walks in the hills near his home. He died at his home in Carlops on 15 November 1959, surrounded by his family.

References

External links

 
The Papers of C. T. R. Wilson held at Churchill Archives Centre

1869 births
1959 deaths
20th-century British physicists
Alumni of Sidney Sussex College, Cambridge
Alumni of the University of Manchester
British Nobel laureates
Fellows of the Royal Society
Members of the Order of the Companions of Honour
Nobel laureates in Physics
People from Midlothian
Recipients of the Copley Medal
Scottish chemists
Scottish Nobel laureates
Scottish physicists
Royal Medal winners
Experimental physicists
Aerosol scientists
Jacksonian Professors of Natural Philosophy
Howard N. Potts Medal recipients
Scottish meteorologists
Fellows of the Royal Society of Edinburgh